Perri is a surname and given name. Notable people with the name include:

Given name
 Perri 6, British social scientist born David Ashworth
 Perri Kiely (born 1995), British street dancer
 Perri Klass, American pediatrician and writer
 Perri Lister (born 1959), English actress, dancer, choreographer, singer, former model and screenwriter
 Perri O'Shaughnessy, pen name of American crime novelists and sisters Mary and Pamela O'Shaughnessy
 Perri "Pebbles" Reid (born 1964), American dance-pop and urban contemporary singer
 Perri Peltz (born 1961), American television journalist
 Perri Pierre (born 1988), American award-winning filmmaker and actor
 Perri Shakes-Drayton (born 1988), British track and field athlete
 Perri Williams (born 1966), Irish racewalker

See also
 Parri, given name and surname
 Peri (name), given name and surname
 Perry (given name)
 Perri (surname)
 Perry (surname)
 Porri (disambiguation), includes list of people with surname Porri

Given names